The Sikorsky MH-60G/HH-60G Pave Hawk is a four-blade, twin-engine, medium-lift utility military helicopter manufactured by Sikorsky Aircraft. It is a derivative of the UH-60 Black Hawk and incorporates the US Air Force PAVE electronic systems program. The HH-60/MH-60 is a member of the Sikorsky S-70 family.

The MH-60G Pave Hawk's primary mission is insertion and recovery of special operations personnel, while the HH-60G Pave Hawk's core mission is recovery of personnel under hostile conditions, including combat search and rescue. Both versions conduct day or night operations into hostile environments. Because of its versatility, the HH-60G may also perform peacetime operations such as civil search and rescue, emergency aeromedical evacuation (MEDEVAC), disaster relief, international aid and counter-drug activities.

Design and development
In 1981, the U.S. Air Force chose the UH-60A Black Hawk to replace its HH-3E Jolly Green Giant helicopters. After acquiring some UH-60s, the Air Force began upgrading each with an air refueling probe and additional fuel tanks in the cabin. The machine guns were changed from 7.62 mm (0.308 in) M60s to .50 caliber (12.7 mm) XM218s. These helicopters were referred to as "Credible Hawks" and entered service in 1987.

Afterwards, the Credible Hawks and new UH-60As were upgraded and designated MH-60G Pave Hawk. These upgrades were to be done in a two-step process. However, funding allowed only 16 Credible Hawks to receive the second step equipment. These helicopters were allocated to special operations use. The remaining 82 Credible Hawks received the first step upgrade equipment and were used for combat search and rescue. In 1991, these search and rescue Pave Hawks were redesignated HH-60G.

The Pave Hawk is a highly modified version of the Sikorsky UH-60 Black Hawk. It features an upgraded communications and navigation suite that includes an integrated inertial navigation/global positioning/Doppler navigation systems, satellite communications, secure voice, and Have Quick communications. The term PAVE stands for Precision Avionics Vectoring Equipment.

All HH-60Gs have an automatic flight control system, night vision goggles lighting and forward looking infrared system that greatly enhances night low-level operations. Additionally, some Pave Hawks have color weather radar and an engine/rotor blade anti-ice system that gives the HH-60G an all-weather capability. Pave Hawk mission equipment includes a retractable in-flight refueling probe, internal auxiliary fuel tanks, two crew-served (or pilot-controlled) 7.62 mm miniguns or .50-caliber machine guns and an 8,000 pound (3,600 kg) capacity cargo hook. To improve air transportability and shipboard operations, all HH-60Gs have folding rotor blades.

Pave Hawk combat enhancements include a radar warning receiver, infrared jammer and a flare/chaff countermeasure dispensing system. HH-60G rescue equipment includes a hoist capable of lifting a 600-pound (270 kg) load from a hover height of 200 feet (60 m), and a personnel locating system. A number of Pave Hawks are equipped with an over-the-horizon tactical data receiver that is capable of receiving near real-time mission update information.

Replacement helicopter

In 1999, the USAF identified a need for a helicopter with improved range, speed, and cabin space. An options analysis was completed in 2002 and funding for 141 aircraft under the "personnel recovery vehicle" program began in 2004.  In 2005, it was renamed CSAR-X, meaning combat search and rescue.  Sikorsky entered the HH-92 Superhawk, Lockheed Martin entered the VH-71 Kestrel, and Boeing entered the HH-47 Chinook. The HH-47 won the competition in November 2006, but the award was cancelled after successful protests from both rival competitors.  A Request for Proposals (RFP) was reissued in 2007, but protested again before proposals were received, leading to a second cancellation. In March 2010, the USAF announced a recapitalization plan to return its 99-aircraft inventory to 112 airframes, incrementally replacing aging HH-60Gs; a secondary plan to replace 13 attrition HH-60s, seven of which were lost in combat since 2001, was also initiated. The USAF deferred secondary combat search and rescue requirements calling for a larger helicopter. A UH-60M-based version was offered as a replacement.

On 22 October 2012, the USAF issued an RFP for up to 112 Combat Rescue Helicopters (CRH) to replace the HH-60G with the primary mission of personnel recovery from hostile territory; other missions include civil search and rescue, disaster relief, casualty and medical evacuation. The AgustaWestland AW101 was one entrant. By December 2012, competitors AgustaWestland, EADS, Boeing, and Bell Helicopter had withdrawn amid claims that the RFP favored Sikorsky and did not reward rival aircraft's capabilities. The USAF argued that the competition was not written to favor Sikorsky, and that the terms were clear as to the capabilities they wanted and could afford. Sikorsky was the only bidder remaining, with subcontractor Lockheed Martin supplying mission equipment and the electronic survivability suite. Sikorsky and the USAF extensively evaluated the proposed CRH-60, a variant of the MH-60 special operations helicopter; the CRH-60 differed from the MH-60 by its greater payload and cabin capacity, wider rotor blades, and better hover capability.

In September 2013, the initial USAF FY 2015 budget proposal would have cancelled the CRH program due to sequestration budget cuts, instead retaining the HH-60 fleet. Congress allocated over $300 million to the program in FY 2014, with $430 million to be moved from other areas through FY 2019 to finance it. On 26 June 2014, the USAF awarded Sikorsky and Lockheed Martin a $1.3 billion contract for the first four aircraft, with 112 total to be procured for a total of up to $7.9 billion. Five more are to be delivered by 2020 and the order is to be completed by 2029. On 24 November 2014, the Air Force officially designated the UH-60M-derived CRH the HH-60W. It first flew on 17 May 2019. In February 2020, the HH-60W was named the "Jolly Green II" by the USAF.

Operational history

As of 2015, the U.S. Air Force HH-60G Pave Hawk is operated by the Air Combat Command (ACC), U.S. Air Forces in Europe (USAFE), Pacific Air Forces (PACAF), Air Education and Training Command (AETC), the Air Force Reserve Command (AFRC) and the Air National Guard (ANG).  A number of HH-60Gs are also operated by the Air Force Materiel Command (AFMC) for flight test purposes.

During Operation Desert Storm, Pave Hawks provided combat search and rescue coverage for coalition Air Forces in western Iraq, Saudi Arabia, coastal Kuwait and the Persian Gulf. They also provided emergency evacuation coverage for U.S. Navy sea, air and land (SEAL) teams penetrating the Kuwaiti coast before the invasion.

All MH-60Gs were subsequently divested by Air Force Special Operations Command (AFSOC) in 1991.  At that time, most MH-60Gs were redesignated as HH-60Gs and transferred to Air Combat Command (ACC) and ACC-gained Air Force Reserve Command and Air National Guard units.

On 29 October 1992, a MH-60G Pave Hawk crashed in the Great Salt Lake of Utah about 100 yards north of Antelope Island during a training exercise in inclement weather. Twelve occupants from the Army's 75th Ranger Regiment and the Air Force's 1st Special Operations Air Wing died in the accident. The pilot, Air Force Maj. Stephan J. Laushine, was the only survivor.

During Operation Allied Force, the Pave Hawk provided continuous combat search and rescue coverage for NATO air forces, and successfully recovered two U.S. Air Force pilots who were isolated behind enemy lines.

In March 2000, three Pave Hawks deployed to Hoedspruit Air Force Base in South Africa, to support international flood relief operations in Mozambique. The HH-60Gs flew 240 missions in 17 days and delivered more than 160 tons  of humanitarian relief supplies.

Air Force Pave Hawks from the Pacific theater also took part in a massive humanitarian relief effort in early 2005 in Sri Lanka to help victims of the tsunami. In the fall of 2005, Pave Hawks from various Air Force commands participated in rescue operations of Hurricane Katrina survivors, rescuing thousands of stranded people.

Pave Hawks have regularly operated during Operation Iraqi Freedom, Operation New Dawn, and continue to be operated in Operation Enduring Freedom, supporting Army and Marine Corps ground combat operations and standby search and rescue support for U.S. and Coalition fixed-wing combat aircraft supporting those ground operations.

On 15 March 2018, a CSAR HH-60G crashed near the Iraqi city of al-Qa'im killing all seven on board. The Air Force is investigating the crash.

Variants
 HH-60A: Prototype for the HH-60D rescue helicopter. A modified UH-60A primarily designed for combat search and rescue. It is equipped with a rescue hoist with a 200 ft (60.96 m) cable that has a 600 lb (270 kg) lift capability, and a retractable in-flight refueling probe.
 HH-60D Night Hawk: Prototype of combat rescue variant for the US Air Force.
 HH-60E: Proposed search and rescue variant for the US Air Force.
 HH-60G Pave Hawk: Search and rescue helicopter for the US Air Force upgraded from UH-60A Credible Hawk.
 MH-60G Pave Hawk: Special Operations, search and rescue model for the US Air Force. Equipped with long-range fuel tanks, air-to-air refueling capability, FLIR, improved radar. Powered by T-700-GE-700/701 engines.
 Maplehawk: Proposed search and rescue version for the Canadian Forces to replace aging CH-113 Labradors. The CF opted for the CH-149 Cormorant instead.
 HH-60P Pave Hawk: Combat Search and Rescue variant of UH-60P, in service with Republic of Korea Air Force. Variant includes External Tank System and FLIR for night operations.
 HH-60W Jolly Green II: Combat rescue helicopter variant of the UH-60M for the U.S. Air Force to replace the HH-60G.

Operators

 Republic of Korea Air Force operates HH-60P helicopters

 United States Air Force 
33d Rescue Squadron
 34th Weapons Squadron
 38th Rescue Squadron
41st Rescue Squadron
55th Rescue Squadron
56th Rescue Squadron
66th Rescue Squadron
101st Rescue Squadron (New York Air National Guard)
129th Rescue Squadron (California Air National Guard)
210th Rescue Squadron (Alaska Air National Guard)
301st Rescue Squadron (Air Force Reserve Command)
305th Rescue Squadron (Air Force Reserve Command) 
413th Flight Test Squadron (Air Force Materiel Command)
512th Rescue Squadron (Air Education & Training Command)

Specifications (HH-60G)

See also

References
 Notes

 Bibliography
 Leoni, Ray D. Black Hawk: The Story of a World Class Helicopter. American Institute of Aeronautics and Astronautics, 2007. .
 Tomajczyk, Stephen F. Black Hawk. MBI, 2003. .

External links

 USAF HH-60G Pave Hawk fact sheet
 HH-60 page and MH-60 page on globalsecurity.org
 Sikorsky S-70 page on helis.com

Search and rescue helicopters
H-060, H
H-060 Pave Hawk
Twin-turbine helicopters
1980s United States helicopters
United States military helicopters
1980s United States military rescue aircraft
Aircraft first flown in 1982